Robert George Stokes (19 April 1908 – 17 February 1980, Palm Springs, California), was an American animator who worked for diverse studios between 1932 and 1941, including Harman-Ising Pictures (1932-33; 1934–36), Iwerks Studio (1933-34), Walt Disney Productions (1937-39) and Leon Schlesinger Productions (1939-41).

Filmography 
 1933 : Bosko's Knight-Mare
 1933 : Bosko the Musketeer
 1934 : Rasslin' Round
 1934 : The Good Scout
 1937 : The Old Mill
 1937 : Snow White and the Seven Dwarfs
 1940 : Fantasia

Notes and references

External links
 

1908 births
1980 deaths
Walt Disney Animation Studios people
American animators
Warner Bros. Cartoons people